Jean-Claude Osman (born March 6, 1947 in La Suze) is a French retired professional football defender.

External links

Profile on French federation official site

1947 births
Living people
French footballers
France international footballers
Association football defenders
FC Nantes players
Angers SCO players
Ligue 1 players